Szolnok is a district in western part of Jász-Nagykun-Szolnok County. Szolnok is also the name of the town where the district seat is found. The district is located in the Northern Great Plain Statistical Region.

Geography 
Szolnok District borders with Jászberény District and Jászapáti District to the north, Kunhegyes District, Törökszentmiklós District and Mezőtúr District to the east, Kunszentmárton District and Tiszakécske District (Bács-Kiskun County) to the south, Cegléd District and Nagykáta District (Pest County) to the west. The number of the inhabited places in Szolnok District is 18.

Municipalities 
The district has 1 urban county, 4 towns and 13 villages.
(ordered by population, as of 1 January 2012)

The bolded municipalities are cities.

Demographics

In 2011, it had a population of 118,241 and the population density was 129/km².

Ethnicity
Besides the Hungarian majority, the main minorities are the Roma (approx. 3,000), German (600), Russian (250) and Romanian (200).

Total population (2011 census): 118,241
Ethnic groups (2011 census): Identified themselves: 106,079 persons:
Hungarians: 100,632 (94.87%)
Gypsies: 3,108 (2.93%)
Others and indefinable: 2,339 (2.20%)
Approx. 12,000 persons in Szolnok District did not declare their ethnic group at the 2011 census.

Religion
Religious adherence in the county according to 2011 census:

Catholic – 36,277 (Roman Catholic – 35,678; Greek Catholic – 589);
Reformed – 7,721;
Evangelical – 525; 
other religions – 1,427; 
Non-religious – 35,231; 
Atheism – 2,257;
Undeclared – 34,803.

Gallery

See also
List of cities and towns of Hungary

References

External links
 Postal codes of the Szolnok District

Districts in Jász-Nagykun-Szolnok County